The 2008 Jade Solid Gold Best Ten Music Awards Presentation (Chinese: 2008年度十大勁歌金曲頒獎典禮) was held on January 3, 2009, at the Kowloon Hong Kong International Trade and Exhibition Centre. It is part of the Jade Solid Gold Best Ten Music Awards Presentation series.

Top 10 song awards
The top 10 songs (十大勁歌金曲) of 2008 are as follows.

Additional awards

References
 TVB Event Jade solid gold 2008

Cantopop
Jade Solid Gold Best Ten Music Awards Presentation, 2008